Renée Reinhard (born 16 March 1990) is a former professional tennis player from the Netherlands.

Biography
Reinhard comes from North Holland, born in Naarden and growing up in Alkmaar, where her mother worked as a tennis teacher. One of six children, she is the youngest of her three sisters, who also played tennis.

She starting playing tennis herself at the age of five, with a highlight of her junior career coming in 2004 when she won the European 14 & Under title.

Debuting on the ITF Circuit in 2006, Reinhard went on to win seven titles, two in singles and five in doubles.

In 2008, she featured in four ties for the Netherlands Fed Cup team. She registered Fed Cup singles wins over Claudine Schaul, Ana Catarina Nogueira and Dia Evtimova. Her only loss came against world No. 2, Ana Ivanovic, but she managed to take the Serbian player to three sets.

ITF finals

Singles (2–2)

Doubles (5–3)

See also
 List of Netherlands Fed Cup team representatives

References

External links
 
 
 

1990 births
Living people
Dutch female tennis players
Sportspeople from North Holland
20th-century Dutch women
20th-century Dutch people
21st-century Dutch women